Sleeping Car to Trieste is a 1948 British comedy thriller film directed by John Paddy Carstairs and starring Jean Kent, Albert Lieven, Derrick De Marney and Rona Anderson. It was shot at Denham Studios outside London. The film's sets were designed by the art director Ralph Brinton. It is a remake of the 1932 film Rome Express.

Plot
The setting is almost entirely on a train travelling between Paris and Trieste after World War II. Two rather mysterious people, Zurta (Albert Lieven) and Valya (Jean Kent), are at ease in sophisticated society. Zurta steals a diary from the safe of an embassy in Paris while they are guests at a reception there, killing a servant who walks in on the robbery. Poole, an accomplice, is passed the diary, but he double-crosses them and attempts to escape with it on the Orient Express. Just in time, Valya and Zurta board the train.

They start looking for Poole, who seeks to conceal himself and the diary.  Other travellers become involved, including a US Army sergeant with an eye for the ladies, an adulterous couple, an idiot stockbroker, a wealthy, autocratic writer and his brow-beaten secretary, an ornithologist, and a French police inspector. Staff and other passengers provide light-hearted scenes. The diary passes through the hands of several people while the police investigate a mysterious death.

Cast
Jean Kent as Valya
Albert Lieven as Zurta
Derrick De Marney as George Grant
Paul Dupuis as Inspector Jolif
Rona Anderson as Joan Maxted
David Tomlinson as Tom Bishop
Bonar Colleano as Sergeant West
Finlay Currie as Alastair MacBain
Grégoire Aslan as Poirier, the chef (as Coco Aslan)
Alan Wheatley as Karl/Charles Poole
Hugh Burden as Mills
David Hutcheson as Denning
Claude Larue as Andrée
Zena Marshall as Suzanne
Leslie Weston as Randall
Michael Ward as Elvin 
Eugene Deckers as Jules
Dino Galvani as Pierre
George De Warfaz as Chef du Train
Gerard Heinz as Ambassador

Production
The film was originally known as Sleeping Car to Vienna.

Rona Anderson made her film debut. "I did enjoy doing it", said Anderson. "It was a film full of nice little cameo performances.... Paddy Carstairs had a good way of relaxing you and I think he had a very good way with actors generally."

It was the one movie Albert Lieven made while under contract to Rank for five years.

However, Jean Kent later stated she "didn't like" the film "and didn't get on very well" with Carstairs. "You never knew where you were with him... I don't remember enjoying it. I had silly clothes. I wanted to be very French in plain black and a little beret but I had to wear these silly New Look clothes. I was playing a superspy of some kind. But who was I spying for?"

Release
The film proved more popular in the US than most British films, enjoying a long run in New York.

The New York Times wrote, "not without its trying moments, but on the whole it is a mighty interesting ride...The director John Paddy Carstairs shrewdly maneuvers the pursuers and the hunted about the train in a natural and credible manner so that the possibility of an imminent meeting creates a good deal of tension...None of the principals is too familiar to audiences here, and at times dialogue is lost in some of the players' throats, but the performances are generally satisfying."

References

External links

 
Review of film at Variety

1948 films
British black-and-white films
British crime films
Remakes of British films
Films directed by John Paddy Carstairs
Films scored by Benjamin Frankel
1948 crime films
Films set in Trieste
Films set in Italy
Films set in Paris
Films set on trains
Films shot at Denham Film Studios
Films set on the Orient Express
1940s English-language films
1940s British films
Two Cities Films films